Travis McGowan (born 13 January 1981 in Mildura, Victoria) is an Australian speedway rider.

Career
McGowan started racing motorbikes the age of ten, and in 1993 he won the Australian Under-16 Championship at Darwin's Northline Speedway. Success continued as he won the Australian Under-21 Speedway Championship in 1998, 2000 and 2002, as well as taking five consecutive victories in the Victorian State Championship between 2001 and 2005. By winning the Victorian title five times in a row, McGowan broke the record of four straight wins previously held by Mildura speedway legends Phil Crump (1972-1975, 1979-1982) and Leigh Adams (1989-1992).

In 1999 McGowan was offered a team spot for the King's Lynn Stars in the British Elite League. He remained in the team for the following season but returned to Australia in 2001. He returned to King's Lynn in 2002 before moving to the Oxford Cheetahs in 2003. In 2006 he switched to the Reading Bulldogs, where he remained for two years before transferring to the Swindon Robins in 2008. Aside from his racing in the British Elite League, McGowan has also ridden for the Swedish Elitersien team Rospiggarna (2006–2008) and the Polish Ekstraliga club Unia Leszno (2007–2008). In 2010 McGowan signed for Premier League team Glasgow Tigers. In 2011, McGowan rode for Premier League team Somerset Rebels, however he was later released by the club.

Travis has since gone on to pioneer the Australian Shovelhead Racing League (ASRL).

Shovel Racing

After retiring from speedway but still with a desire to race, Travis founded the Australian Shovelhead Racing League. The first official race took place in Albury (Victoria) in 2015. The racing is performed on a speedway or other oval track over 4 laps. Motorcycles must be a Harley Davidson built between 1966–1983. If any other sort of motorcycle is included so as to make up a full racing field they will have appropriate handicaps assigned.

The first race meeting in Albury was under lights with a good crowd in attendance.

World Final appearances

Individual Under-21 World Championship
 2000 -  Gorzów Wielkopolski, Edward Jancarz Stadium - 10th - 6pts

References

1981 births
Living people
Australian speedway riders
Swindon Robins riders
Oxford Cheetahs riders
Reading Racers riders
King's Lynn Stars riders